Dan and Nick: The Wildebeest Years was a BBC Radio 4 comedy series originally broadcast in seven episodes in 1998. The Dan and Nick of the title are Dan Freedman and Nick Romero, who often appeared on Loose Ends.

A follow-up series of a further six episodes was made, this time called Forty Nights in the Wildebeest.  Both series have been re-broadcast on BBC 7 during 2006 and 2007.

The characteristic feature of Dan and Nick's style is the heavy use of puns. Indeed, the frequency of puns incorporated into these programmes has rarely been matched since I'm Sorry I'll Read That Again.

Themes 
The shows premise centred on short sketches and songs performed in a cabaret style. Dan and Nick had a supporting band, 'The Gents' who would accompany them on musical sections. Typical sketches included lampooning films, music, and other popular culture. The "Britishness" of the show was reflected in the interest in subjects such as the royal family, and Radio 4, the station on which it was broadcast, with a fascination for characters such as Brian Perkins. And the program itself owes much to forerunners of the radio comedy genre, such as Round the Horne, I'm Sorry I Haven't a Clue, and The Navy Lark. Other shows since, such as Dead Ringers could also be said to have been influenced by it. Some recurring jokes were:
Incy Wincy Quincy, a spider pathologist, obviously lifted from TV-show Quincy, M.E.;
Tossed in Space, a satire of Lost in Space about trapped salad items in space;
censorship gags, for example, reading football scores while bleeping out any innocuous sounding words, including from the middle of words;
The Annals of History and The Century's Passage, a humorous and satirical look back through historic events;
Robin Would, a gay and camp version of Robin Hood with guest Richard Coles playing the lead,  whose catchphrase was "What would you have me do? Live a lie?";
The Big Fact Hunt (always pronounced very carefully), another excuse to introduce as many one liners as possible on a particular theme.

Forty Nights in the Wildebeest
Forty Nights in the Wildebeest was the name of a follow-up series of six programmes, first broadcast on BBC Radio 4 in the year 2000.  It followed a similar format to The Wildebeest Years: a quick-fire mixture of pun-laden short sketches and musical numbers.

The second show in the series was recorded at the Edinburgh Festival.  Sketches included Hong Feng Shui and a musical number by Right Said Freud

A running gag in the series was a Radio 4 -style announcer saying:
"And now, the radio foreplay. <pause> I'm sorry, I'll read that again. <pause> And now, the Radio 4 play."
It is likely they were also paying homage to the granddaddy of pun-based radio comedy, I'm Sorry, I'll Read That Again.

External links
radiohaha article

BBC Radio comedy programmes
1998 radio programme debuts